Huangyuania is a genus of East Asian funnel weavers containing the single species, Huangyuania tibetana. It was  first described by D. X. Song & Z. S. Li in 1990, and has only been found in China.

References

External links

Agelenidae
Monotypic Araneomorphae genera
Spiders of China